Cape Steen Bille or Kap Bille, also known as Kangeq, is a headland in the North Atlantic Ocean, southeast Greenland, Kujalleq municipality.

History
Cape Steen Bille was named in 1829 by Lieutenant Wilhelm August Graah (1793–1863) after Steen Andersen Bille (1797–1883), Danish Royal Navy vice-admiral and minister for the navy.

Fridtjof Nansen visited the area in 1888 before his crossing of the Greenland ice sheet from the east.

Geography
The cluster of the Otto Rud Islands lies to the NNW around the cape.

References

External links
 Seabirds and seals in Southeast Greenland

Steen Bille